Constantin Frățilă (1 October 1942 – 21 October 2016) was a Romanian football striker and coach.

Club career
Constantin Frățilă was born on 1 October 1942 in Bucharest, Romania and started to play football in 1957, at junior level at Recolta București, after one year moving to Uzinele Vasile Roaită. He started his senior career playing for Dinamo București, making his Divizia A debut on 16 April 1961 in a 6–0 victory against Minerul Lupeni in which he scored a hat-trick, having a total of 7 goals in 7 appearances until the end of his first season spent at the club. In the following four seasons he helped the club win four consecutive Divizia A titles, in the first he contributed with 5 goals scored in 19 matches, in the second he played 15 games and scored 9 goals, in the third he made 26 appearances with 19 goals scored, being also the top-scorer of the league alongside Cornel Pavlovici and in the last one he scored 11 goals in 23 matches. He also won two Cupa României with The Red Dogs, scoring one goal in the 5–3 victory from the 1964 Cupa României Final against rival Steaua București and played in 11 European Cup matches in which he scored 7 goals and one game in the UEFA Cup Winners' Cup, in the 1965–66 European Cup edition he scored two goals against Denmark's champion, Boldklubben 1909 which helped the team advance to the next phase where they were eliminated by Inter Milan against whom he also scored a goal after which he said:"I scored a goal against Inter, can you believe it? I scored against the best defense in the world. It is the biggest satisfaction of my life" and he also scored a goal in a 5–3 loss against Real Madrid in the 1963–64 European Cup edition. In a 1967 Bucharest Cup match against Steaua he suffered a injury which kept him off the field for one year and a half. In 1970 he went to play for Argeș Pitești where in his second season he helped the team win the Divizia A title, contributing with 7 goals scored in 17 matches. After a season spent at Sportul Studențesc București, he went to play in Cyprus in the 1973–74 season alongside fellow Romanian Mihai Mocanu, winning the title and the cup. He returned to Romania at Chimia Râmnicu Vâlcea where he made his last Divizia A appearance on 20 November 1974 in a 1–0 victory against Sportul Studențesc, ending his career in 1975 at Divizia C team, Sirena București. Constantin Frățilă died on 21 October 2016 at age 74.

International career
Constantin Frățilă played 7 games in which he scored 7 goals at international level for Romania, making his debut under coach Ilie Oană on 2 November 1966 in a 4–2 victory against Switzerland in which he scored a hat-trick at the Euro 1968 qualifiers. He played two more games at the Euro 1968 qualifiers in which he scored a double in a 5–1 victory against Cyprus. Frățilă made his last appearance for the national team on 22 March 1967 in a friendly which ended with a 2–1 victory against France in which he scored a goal.

International goals
Scores and results list Romania's goal tally first. "Score" column indicates the score after each Constantin Frățilă goal.

Managerial career
Constantin Frățilă started coaching in 1976 at Dinamo București's center of children and juniors, afterwards coaching senior teams Dinamo Victoria București which he helped earn promotion to Divizia B and FC Baia Mare which he coached in the 1984–85 Divizia A season.

Honours

Player
Dinamo București
Divizia A: 1961–62, 1962–63, 1963–64, 1964–65
Cupa României: 1963–64, 1967–68
Argeș Pitești
Divizia A: 1971–72
Omonia Nicosia
Cypriot League: 1973–74
Cypriot Cup: 1973–74
Individual
Divizia A top scorer: 1963–64

Manager
Dinamo Victoria București
Divizia C: 1981–82

References

External links

1942 births
2016 deaths
Footballers from Bucharest
Romanian footballers
Romanian expatriate footballers
Romania international footballers
Liga I players
Cypriot First Division players
FC Dinamo București players
FC Argeș Pitești players
FC Sportul Studențesc București players
AC Omonia players
Expatriate footballers in Cyprus
Association football forwards
Romanian football managers
Victoria București managers
CS Minaur Baia Mare (football) managers